Events in the year 1823 in Portugal.

Incumbents
Monarch: John VI

Events

Births
 thumb |right |100 px |Augusto Carlos Teixeira de Aragão 

2 May – José Vicente Barbosa du Bocage, zoologist and politician (d. 1907).

15 June – Augusto Carlos Teixeira de Aragão, Army officer, doctor, numismatist, archaeologist and historian (d. 1903).

3 August – Henrique O'Neill, 1st Viscount of Santa Mónica, writer, jurist and politician (d. 1889).

Deaths

11 September – José Correia da Serra, Abbot, polymath, philosopher, diplomat, politician and scientist (b. 1750 or 1751).

References

 
1820s in Portugal
Years of the 19th century in Portugal